Sandhippu is a 1983 Indian Tamil-language masala film, directed by C. V. Rajendran and produced by Santhi Narayanasamy. The film stars Sivaji Ganesan, Sridevi, Sujatha, M. N. Nambiar and Prabhu. It is a remake of the 1981 Hindi film Naseeb. The film ran for over 175 days in theatres, becoming a silver jubilee hit.

Plot 
Ramanathan is the trustee of the town temple and Muthayya is the dharmagatha. The two men are highly respected in town and their families are also close.
Rajavelu works for Ramanathan but it is a cover to scope the temple and steal the jewelry. He and his partner Vedagiri drug Ramanathan, kill Muthayya and steal the jewels. Ramanathan finds them but they threaten his family to force him to sign a confession then beat him up. The police believe Ramanathan to be the thief and the incensed townspeople drive his wife, Lakshmi, and his sons out of town. Lakshmi and the boys – Raja and Vijay – are separated. Many years later, Raja works as a waiter at a club and a part-time boxer to put Vijay through college. Lakshmi is the adoptive mother to singer Geetha who performs at the same club as Raja. Vijay is in love with collegemate Chithra. She is the deceased Muthayya's daughter but neither is aware of their connection. Raja and Geetha also fall in love but have to contend with Prem – the new co-owner of the club and Vedagiri's son – lusting after Geetha. Rajavelu and Vedagiri are now very rich men that work for the mysterious and powerful criminal Don. Raja recognizes Rajavelu when he visits the club and begins investigating the two. This soon leads him to Don who Raja is shocked to realize is his father. He also rekindles his friendship with his childhood friend Vasanth who he learns is Rajavelu's son and another owner of the club. To complicate matters further, Vasanth falls in love with Geetha. Raja must now unwind the complicated mess he finds himself in to reunite his scattered family and bring the criminals to justice.

Cast 

Sivaji Ganesan as Ramanathan and Raja
Sujatha as Lakshmi
Prabhu as Vijay
Sridevi as Geetha
Radha as Chitra
Major Sundarrajan as Rajavelu
M. N. Nambiar as Vedagiri
Sathyaraj as Dany
Sarath Babu as Vasanth
R. N. Sudarshan as Don
Manorama as Saroja
Vijayakumar as Prem
Vadivukkarasi as Thangu
Delhi Ganesh as Muthayya
Gandhimathi as Philomina
Vennira Aadai Moorthy as Principal
Master Haja Sheriff

Soundtrack 
The music was composed by M. S. Viswanathan.

References

External links 
 

1980s masala films
1980s Tamil-language films
1983 films
Films directed by C. V. Rajendran
Films scored by M. S. Viswanathan
Tamil remakes of Hindi films